2873 Binzel, provisional designation , is a stony Florian asteroid and binary system from the inner regions of the asteroid belt, approximately 6.5 kilometers in diameter. It was discovered on 28 March 1982, by American astronomer Edward Bowell at the Anderson Mesa Station in Flagstaff, Arizona. The asteroid was named after astronomer Richard Binzel. Its 1.6-kilometer minor-planet moon was discovered in 2019.

Orbit and classification 

Binzel is a member of the Flora family, a giant asteroid family and the largest family of stony asteroids in the main-belt. It orbits the Sun in the inner main belt at a distance of 1.9–2.6 AU once every 3 years and 5 months (1,234 days). Its orbit has an eccentricity of 0.16 and an inclination of 6° with respect to the ecliptic.

Physical characteristics 

In the SMASS classification, Binzel is a Sq-subtype, which transition from the common stony S-type asteroids to the less common Q-types.

Rotation period 

In September 2010, a rotational lightcurve of Binzel was obtained from photometric observations in the R-band by astronomers at the Palomar Transient Factory in California. Lightcurve analysis gave a rotation period of 11.560 hours with a brightness variation of 0.14 magnitude.

Diameter and albedo 

According to the survey carried out by the NEOWISE mission of NASA's Wide-field Infrared Survey Explorer, Binzel measures 6.426 and 7.011 kilometers in diameter and its surface has an albedo of 0.2307 and 0.272, respectively.

The Collaborative Asteroid Lightcurve Link assumes an albedo of 0.24 – derived from 8 Flora, the largest member and namesake of the Flora family – and calculates a diameter of 6.48 kilometers based on an absolute magnitude of 13.11.

Naming 

This minor planet was named after American astronomer Richard Binzel (born 1958) of the University of Texas at Austin. During the 1980s, Binzel has been a prolific photometrist, obtaining a large number of rotational lightcurves of main-belt asteroids. The official naming citation was prepared by Alan W. Harris and published by the Minor Planet Center on 8 November 1984.

References

External links 
 Asteroid Lightcurve Database (LCDB), query form (info )
 Dictionary of Minor Planet Names, Google books
 Asteroids and comets rotation curves, CdR – Observatoire de Genève, Raoul Behrend
 Discovery Circumstances: Numbered Minor Planets (1)-(5000) – Minor Planet Center
 
 

002873
Discoveries by Edward L. G. Bowell
Named minor planets
002873
002873
19820328